Quarantine L.A., also known as Infected, is a 2013 American action horror film about seven strangers who band together for survival in the aftermath of a devastating viral outbreak. The film was written and directed by Filip Maciejewicz, in his directorial debut, and starred Bo Linton, Eugenia Kuzmina and Adrian Voo.

Premise 

A group of seven strangers survive and escape from an isolated area of Los Angeles that has been infected by a strange, human changing virus.

Plot 

July 18, 2017 - An unknown type of virus starts to spread all over the Los Angeles area. In the first 14 days, it kills more than 3/4 of the population causing a major panic outbreak all around the world. The U.S. government isolates the entire affected zone. By the middle of September, the structure of the virus strain begins to evolve into a human changing virus. The infected become rotting, corpse-like creatures with an unconditional hunger for human flesh. During the day, they hide from the sun. By night, they begin to hunt like animals. All efforts to search for survivors in the area were deemed futile.

On November 26, a local news channel receives an exclusive video message from J.S.O.C. (Joint Special Operations Command) Chief Sergeant, Jake Miller. The video exposes that he and a group of six survivors are trapped in the infected zone and surviving on limited supplies and resources. The video was not well received by the J.S.O.C. special opts team who had previously announced that there were no survivors from the infected zone.

Cast 

Bo Linton as Jake Miller
Eugenia Kuzmina as Arlene Balric 
Adrian Voo as Quentin Mayers
Adia Dinh as Jenny Darcy
Nina Kate as Kim Harding
Dillaran Martin as Jared Quinn
Timon Morales as Flynn Wilson
Robert Coffie as featured Zombie

Release 
The film premiered under its original title Infected in Los Angeles on March 9, 2013 at the historic New Beverly Cinema. The international premiere was held on March 18, 2013 in Hong Kong, as part of HKTDC Hong Kong International Film & TV Market (FILMART). It screened at various film festivals and was released internationally as Infected on DVD and Blu-Ray.

The film was repackaged as Quarantine L.A. and released in the U.S. on February 2, 2016.

External links

References 

2013 films
American action films
American science fiction horror films
American zombie films
2013 directorial debut films
2010s English-language films
2010s American films